Let It Happen may refer to:

Let It Happen (MxPx album), 1998
Let It Happen (Jazz Piano Quartet album), 1974
"Let It Happen" (song), a 2015 song by Tame Impala
"Let It Happen" (Jimmy Eat World song), on the 2007 album Chase This Light